"Follow Me" is a song cover by Greek singer Demis Roussos from his 1982 studio album Attitudes. It was also released as a single (in 1982 on Mercury Records).

Background and writing 
The song was written by Herbert Kretzmer, Hal Shaper, and Joaquín Rodrigo. The recording was produced by Rainer Pietsch.

Commercial performance 
The song reached no. 27 in the Netherlands and no. 32 in Belgium (Flanders).

Track listing 
7" single Mercury 6200 039 (1982, France, Netherlands, Portugal)
7" single Mercury 6000 903 (1982, France, Spain)
 A. "Follow Me" (Adagio Movement Of The Concierto De Aranjuez) (5:55)
 B. "Song Without End" (4:09)

7" single Polydor DR 2 (1982, UK
 A. "Follow Me (Edited Version) (written by Rodrigo/Kretzmer/Shaper)
 B. "Lament" (written by Jon Anderson)

Charts

References

External links 

 Demis Roussos — "Follow Me" at Discogs

Year of song missing
1982 singles
Demis Roussos songs
Mercury Records singles
Songs with lyrics by Herbert Kretzmer
Songs written by Hal Shaper